Euphorbia bosseri is a species of plant in the family Euphorbiaceae. It is endemic to Madagascar.  Its natural habitat is subtropical or tropical dry forests. It is threatened by habitat loss. The species epithet commemorates Jean Marie Bosser, a Mauritian botanist who contributed largely to the flora of Madagascar.

References

Endemic flora of Madagascar
bosseri
Vulnerable plants
Taxonomy articles created by Polbot